Andrew Taylor Boggs (born February 20, 1987) is an American football center who is a free agent. He was a walk on at Humboldt State in Arcata, California. He was signed by the New York Jets as an undrafted free agent in 2011.

College career
Boggs walked on to Humboldt State University's football team and was unsuccessful in making the roster.  After a year Boggs gave it another try and went on to be a 3 time team captain and all conference/all American player.

Professional career

New York Jets
After going unselected in 2011 NFL Draft, Boggs signed with the New York Jets as an undrafted free agent. He was placed on injured reserve in August 2011 before being cut in April 2012.

Chicago Bears
Boggs appeared in one game for the Bears in 2013 despite dressing all 16 games. Although Boggs was set to be an exclusive rights free agent after 2013, he was resigned to a one-year deal on February 24, 2014. After playing in 4 of the first 5 games he received an injury settlement from the Bears and was released on October 16, 2014.

Arizona Cardinals
On January 5, 2016, Boggs signed a reserve/future contract with the Arizona Cardinals. He was placed on injured reserve on December 27, 2016 with a shoulder injury.

Chicago Bears (second stint)
On May 1, 2017, Boggs re-signed with the Bears. He was released on September 2, 2017.

References

External links
 Chicago Bears bio
 New York Jets bio
 NFL Draft Scout bio

Living people
1987 births
Sportspeople from Pasadena, California
American football centers
Humboldt State Lumberjacks football players
New York Jets players
Chicago Bears players
Arizona Cardinals players
Tampa Bay Buccaneers players